KDNS (94.1 FM) is a radio station broadcasting a Country music format. Licensed to Downs, Kansas, United States. The station is currently owned by Dierking Communications.

References

External links
 

Country radio stations in the United States
DNS
Radio stations established in 1982
1982 establishments in Kansas